Charles Albert Bartliff (18 August 1886 – 15 March 1962) was an American amateur soccer player who competed in the 1904 Summer Olympics. He was born in Memphis, Tennessee. In 1904 he was a member of the Christian Brothers College team, which won the silver medal in the soccer tournament. He played all four matches as a forward.

References

External links
profile

1886 births
1962 deaths
American soccer players
Footballers at the 1904 Summer Olympics
Olympic silver medalists for the United States in soccer
Soccer players from Memphis, Tennessee
Medalists at the 1904 Summer Olympics
Christian Brothers Cadets men's soccer players
Association football forwards
Christian Brothers University alumni